Western Highway may refer to:
Western Highway (Victoria) in Australia
Western Highway (Belize)